Wymondham railway station is on the Breckland Line in the East of England, serving the town of Wymondham, Norfolk.

The station is managed by Greater Anglia, which also operates most of the services calling at the station. Some East Midlands Railway services also stop at Wymondham.  Platform 2 has no disabled accessibility.

History

The Bill for the Norwich & Brandon Railway (N&BR) received Royal Assent on 10 May 1844. Work started on the line in 1844 and the line and its stations were opened on 30 July 1845. The link into Norwich was delayed due to the need to build a bridge over the River Wensum that kept the river navigable.

One month before the N&BR opened a Bill authorising the amalgamation of the Yarmouth & Norwich Railway with the N&BR came into effect and so Wymondham station became a Norfolk Railway asset.

In November 1845 Spinks Lane station was permanently closed as the NR determined that having two stations in the village was excessive. With the closure of Spinks Lane the next station east of Wymondham became .

An Act of Parliament on 7 August 1862 authorised the amalgamation of the Eastern Counties Railway, the Eastern Union Railway and others, which formed the Great Eastern Railway, which had taken place on 1 July 1862.

19 years after the GER was formed the GER promoted a Bill to build a cut-off line from  via  on the Great Eastern Main Line to the Norwich-Ely line at Wymondham. Work started in 1880 and the line opened on 2 May 1881.

The difficult economic circumstances after World War I led the Government to pass the Railways Act 1921 which led to the creation of the Big Four. The GER amalgamated with several other companies to create the London and North Eastern Railway (LNER). Wymondham became an LNER station on 1 January 1923. The line to Forncett closed in 1939.

On nationalisation in 1948 the station and its services were transferred to the Eastern Region of British Railways.

The Wells branch closed to passengers on 6 October 1969, with freight services continuing until 1989; the section of that line between Wymondham and Dereham forms the Mid-Norfolk Railway.

Upon privatisation the station and most of its services were transferred to Anglia Railways on 5 January 1997, with services towards the Midlands were transferred to Central Trains on 2 March 1997.

On 1 April 2004 the station and its services were transferred to National Express East Anglia, then known as one. The station's ticket office reopened in 2005. On 5 February 2012 the station and its services were transferred to Abellio Greater Anglia. In August 2019, all services operated by East Midlands Trains were transferred to East Midlands Railway, upon the expiry of EMT's franchise.

This was removed gradually during the early part of 2009 and was the last section remaining in England and one of the last remaining in the United Kingdom. In 2012 the local signal box was decommissioned (as indeed were all the boxes on the Breckland Line) and the semaphore signalling was replaced by lightweight LED signals controlled from Cambridge.

The station is managed by Abellio Greater Anglia, which also operates most of the services calling at the station. Some East Midlands Railway services also stop at Wymondham.

Mid-Norfolk Railway

Services
, from Monday to Saturday there is typically one train per hour eastbound to  operated by Greater Anglia. There are also four trains per day to Norwich operated by East Midlands Railway.

On Sundays there is typically one train per hour to Norwich and one train per hour to Stansted Airport, operated by Greater Anglia.

Rolling stock 
Until 2010 three items of rolling stock were displayed on a short section of isolated line laid close to the station, originally intended to house a camping coach. These were Drewry 0-4-0 diesel shunter VF D297 DC 2583 of 1956, disguised as a Class 04 tram locomotive, a British Railways tube wagon, and a SECR 25 ton brake van, formerly used as Stratford crane mess van. The wagons have since been relocated to Whitwell & Reepham railway station, with the locomotive moving to the Bressingham Steam Museum.

Possible developments
The Mid-Norfolk Railway has proposed extending that line to an adjacent interchange station. The proposed Norfolk Orbital Railway would see services restored between Wymondham and the Norfolk coast, involving use of the track owned by the Mid-Norfolk Railway.

References

External links 

Website Wymondham Station's own website

Photographs From Geograph

Railway stations in Norfolk
Former Great Eastern Railway stations
Railway stations in Great Britain opened in 1845
Railway stations served by East Midlands Railway
Greater Anglia franchise railway stations